Dwight Yoakam is an American country music singer-songwriter. Since his debut single, "Honky Tonk Man" in 1986, he has released 46 singles, including two Billboard Hot Country Songs number one singles, as well as 6 number ones in Canada. In addition to having two number one singles in the United States, Yoakam also has thirteen Top 10 singles on the country chart.

His 1993 album This Time is his best-selling album, being certified triple-platinum by the Recording Industry Association of America, without having charted a number one single. The album had three consecutive number two hits, with two additional Top 30 singles. During the late-1990s and 2000s, Yoakam's radio audience had virtually disappeared. Since 2000, he has charted only one Top 40 single, "What Do You Know About Love", that reached number 26. Subsequent singles failed to reach the Top 40, or even chart at all. His last chart appearance occurred in 2005, with "Blame the Vain", which reached number 58 on the country chart.

Singles

1980s

1990s

2000s and 2010s

Other singles

Christmas singles

Guest singles

Notes

Videography

Music videos

Guest appearances

References

Country music discographies
 
Discographies of American artists